Robert Leslie "Bob" Parry is an Australian former cricket umpire. Parry umpired in Australian domestic cricket from 1998 until 2012.

Umpiring career 
In December 1998 he had his first-class debut and then his ODI debut on January 11, 2002. His international debut with the T20 International was on January 9, 2006. He had 7 test matches all as 3rd umpire and 34 ODIs, 4 of which were on-field and 30 of which were as 3rd umpire. He had 3 T20 Internationals, 2 of which were on-field and 1 of which was 3rd umpire. He had 79 Sheffield Shield/Pura Cup matches which included four finals (77 on-field and 2 as 3rd umpire). He had 53 one-day domestic matches which included two finals (45 on-field and 8 as 3rd umpire). He also had 24 other first-class or list "A" matches which includes tour matches, Aus A and Women's International matches.

See also
 List of One Day International cricket umpires
 List of Twenty20 International cricket umpires

References

1953 births
Living people
Australian cricket umpires
Australian One Day International cricket umpires
Australian Twenty20 International cricket umpires
People from Melbourne